Laurel V. Korholz (born June 10, 1970) was the Women's Assistant Coach for the United States Rowing Team. As a coach, Korholz coached the US Women's Double at the 2008 Summer Olympics. The Beijing Olympics was the fourth Olympics she attended; her first as a coach.  As an athlete, she won a silver medal at the 2004 Summer Olympics in the women's eight. Now she is the Assistant Head Coach of Heavyweight Rowing at Columbia University as of 2022

Korholz received a gold medal in the eight at the 2004 Lucerne BearingPoint World Cup, a gold medal at the 2004 Munich BearingPoint World Cup.  She placed sixth at the 2003 FISA World Championships in the quads and received a gold medal in the quads at the 2003 Bearing Point World Cup in Milan.

At the 2002 FISA World Championships, she placed eighth in the doubles and fourth in the doubles at the 2002 FISA Lucerne World Cup.  Fifth in the quads at the 2000 Olympic Games in Sydney, Australia, bronze in the quads at the Lucerne FISA World Cup in 2000.  Fourth in the quad at the 1999 FISA World Championships. Fourth in the doubles at the 1998 FISA World Championships.  Ninth in the quads at the 1997 FISA World Championships.

She placed fourth in the eights in the 1996 Olympic Games at Atlanta.  Gold medal in the eight at the 1996 Lucerne International Regatta and the 1996 Mannheim International Regatta.  Bronze in the eight at the 1996 Essen International Regatta, gold in the eight at the 1995 FISA World Championships, Silver Medal in the eight at the 1994 FISA World Championships.  Bronze in the eight (500 m)and fourth in the eight (1000 m) at the 1994 Goodwill Games.

She served as a spare at the 1993 FISA World Championships.

Korholz is an 11-time member of the US National Rowing Team.

She was born in New York City, New York.

References

External links 
 Korholz's bio on the USRowing web site

1970 births
Living people
Olympic silver medalists for the United States in rowing
Rowers at the 2004 Summer Olympics
Rowers at the 2000 Summer Olympics
Rowers at the 1996 Summer Olympics
American female rowers
Medalists at the 2004 Summer Olympics
World Rowing Championships medalists for the United States
Sportspeople from New York City
Goodwill Games medalists in rowing
Competitors at the 1994 Goodwill Games
21st-century American women